Michał Dymitr Tadeusz Krajewski (8 September 1746 – 5 July 1817), sometimes also referred to as Dymitr M. Krajewski, was a Polish writer and educational activist of the times of the Enlightenment in Poland. His 1784 book Podolanka became the most debated and published Polish novel of that year, and his next book, Wojciech Zdarzyński, is considered to be the first Polish science-fiction novel.

Biography 
Krajewski (coat of arms Jasieńczyk) was born in the Rus Voivodeship on 8 September 1746. On 22 July 1763 he joined the order of Piarists in Podoliniec, where he gained the name of Dymitr. After his novitiate he studied rhetoric and philosophy in Międzyrzecze Koreckie. From 1769 he attended the Piarists college in Warsaw and in 1782 he became a prefect of Collegium Nobilium. Author of several books and other literary works, he was supported by the Church itself. In 1788 he took the rectory in Białaczów. In 1793 he left the priesthood and settled in Końskie. In 1809 he moved to Warsaw, where he joined the Society of Friends of Science (Towarzystwo Przyjaciół Nauk).

Works 
Krajewski's writings concentrated on social issues and political debate about the need to reform the Polish–Lithuanian Commonwealth (along the lines suggested by Jean-Jacques Rousseau). He was the supporter of the reformists idea, especially in the area of the education (like the reforms of the Commission of National Education, first ministry of education in the world).

His first book published in 1784 was the Podolanka wychowana w stanie natury, życie i przypadki swoje opisująca (The Podolian Girl: raised in the natural state, describing her life and events), inspired by French book by Henri Joseph Du Laurens (Imirce, ou la fille de la nature). The main hero, a female, criticizes humanity's efforts to destroy and subordinate nature. Podolanka initiated the first literary debate in Poland and had seven editions in one year.

In 1785 he published another book, the Wojciech Zdarzyński życie i przypadki swoje opisujący (Wojciech Zdarzynski - life and adventures of himself describing) - about the adventures of a young Pole who uses a balloon to visit a utopian country on the Moon. The book is considered the first Polish science-fiction book. Krajewski published a sequel to it in 1786 - Pani Podczaszyna. Tom drugi Przypadków Wojciecha Zdarzyńskiego (Cup-Bearers's wife. Second tome of adventures of Wojciech Zdarzynski). Those books were influenced by the earlier works of bishop Ignacy Krasicki, who is recognized as the author of the first Polish novel (Mikołaja Doświadczyńskiego przypadki, 1776).

Near the end of his life Krajewski wrote a historical work Dzieje panowania Jana Kazimierza od roku 1656 do jego abdykacji w roku 1668 (Times of reign of Jan Kazimierz from 1656 to his abdication in 1668). The first volume was published in 1846; the second was lost. This book was part of the Society of Friends of Science project aimed at compiling a modern history of Poland. Among his other historical books was one about hetman Stefan Czarniecki (1830).

His novels Podolanka and Wojciech Zdarzyński have been published several times in the 20th century and later.

References

External links 
  Konstanty Wojciechwowski, Pierwsze naśladownictwo "Nowej Heloizy" w romansie polskim: (ks. Krajewskiego "Pani Podczaszyna" 1786), Kraków 1908 
  Longer description of 'Podolanka'
  Longer description of Wojciech Zdarzyński' - and another one

Further reading 
 Irena Łossowska, Michał Dymitr Krajewski. Zarys monograficzny, Warszawa 1980.

1746 births
1817 deaths
19th-century Polish historians
Polish male non-fiction writers
Piarists
18th-century Polish Roman Catholic priests
18th-century Polish–Lithuanian novelists
19th-century Polish novelists
Polish male novelists
19th-century Polish male writers
18th-century male writers
18th-century Polish historians